The 1994–95 New Zealand Women's Centenary Tournament was a Women's One Day International (WODI) cricket tournament that was held in New Zealand in February 1995. It was a tri-nation series between Australia, India and New Zealand. It was part of Australia's and India's tours of New Zealand, and the matches between Australia and New Zealand were played for the Rose Bowl, which was drawn 1–1.

India and New Zealand progressed to the final, winning two group stage matches each. India went on to win the tournament, beating New Zealand by 20 runs in the final.

Squads

Points table

Source: ESPN Cricinfo

Fixtures

1st ODI

2nd ODI

3rd ODI

4th ODI

5th ODI

6th ODI

Final

See also
 Australian women's cricket team in New Zealand in 1994–95
 Indian women's cricket team in New Zealand in 1994–95

References

External links
New Zealand Women's Centenary Tournament 1994/95 from Cricinfo

Women's international cricket tours of New Zealand
India women's national cricket team tours
Australia women's national cricket team tours
1995 in women's cricket